Dindisc (often rendered DinDisc) was a UK record label, an imprint of Virgin Records but operating semi-independently, which issued new releases from mid-1979 through early 1982. It is no longer active, but CD reissues on Virgin still mention the label and have Dindisc catalogue numbers.

The imprint was founded and run by Carol Wilson, who had previously discovered Sting and signed him to Virgin's music publishing company. Talking about the signing of Orchestral Manoeuvres in the Dark to Dindisc, she later said: "OMD were a perfect fit for what I had in mind for DinDisc — they had a serious, artistic side with real depth, as well as a commercial, pop side. That duality was reflected in all the early DinDisc signings, like Martha and the Muffins, and then the Monochrome Set."

Many of the company's sleeves were designed by the in-house designer Peter Saville. Saville had started at Factory Records, but came to Wilson's attention when she signed Factory band OMD; she had been particularly interested by Saville's thermographic paper sleeve for the Factory release of "Electricity". Saville delivered the artwork for the Dindisc release of "Electricity"
and asked Wilson if Dindisc needed an art director. Saville and Ben Kelly won a Designers and Art Directors Award for their work on the album Orchestral Manoeuvres in the Dark.

The label's first release (DIN-1) was "Where's the Boy for Me" by the Rezillos, released in September 1979. The label's most notable chart successes included Martha and the Muffins' "Echo Beach" (UK #5 in 1980) and several early singles by OMD, including "Enola Gay", "Souvenir", "Joan of Arc" and "Maid of Orleans (The Waltz Joan of Arc)", all of which hit the UK top 10 in 1980/81.

The label ceased operations after the release of Hot Gossip's "I Don't Depend on You" (DIN-39) in February 1982, after Wilson failed to obtain a shareholding. The Orchestral Manoeuvres In The Dark single "Maid of Orleans (The Waltz Joan of Arc)" had the final number in catalogue sequence (DIN-40), but was actually released a few weeks earlier, in January 1982.  The dissolution of Dindisc led to Saville and Brett Wickens establishing their own studio, Peter Saville Associates.

Discography

Albums

Singles

See also
 List of record labels

Sources

References

1979 establishments in the United Kingdom
1982 disestablishments in the United Kingdom
Virgin Records
Rock record labels
Pop record labels
New wave record labels
Post-punk record labels
Defunct record labels of the United Kingdom